WOW Hits 2009 is a two-disc compilation album composed of some of the biggest hits on Christian radio during the previous year.  Disc one features more of the adult contemporary hits, while disc two features the CHR–pop and rock hits.

The album reached number 1 on Billboard's Top Christian Albums chart in 2008, and also number 31 on the Billboard 200 chart.  It was certified as gold on 20 January 2009 by the Recording Industry Association of America (RIAA), and then went platinum on April 30, 2010.

Track listing

Charts

Weekly charts

Year-end charts

References

External links
 WOW Hits official website

2008 compilation albums
2009